Memić or Memiç is a surname. Notable people with the surname include:

Almir Memić (footballer, born 1962), Bosnian football manager and former footballer
Almir Memić (footballer, born 1975), Bosnian former footballer
Dalio Memić (born 1990), Bosnian footballer
Gizem Memiç (born 1990), Turkish beauty pageant contestant from Gaziantep who won Miss Turkey 2010
Haris Memic (born 1995), Dutch footballer
Muhamed Memić (born 1960), Yugoslav handball player who competed in the 1988 Summer Olympics
Seid Memić (born 1950), Bosnian singer and the vocalist for the Yugoslav rock band Teška industrija

Bosnian surnames